The Bingham-Blossom House, also known as Figulus, was a historic home and landscaped estate in Palm Beach, Palm Beach County, southeastern Florida. It was located at 1250 South Ocean Boulevard. It was damaged by fire and demolished in 1974.

History
The residence was completed in 1893 in the Shingle Style, for Charles William Bingham and wife, Mary Payne Bingham, of Cleveland, Ohio. It was the first privately owned residence on the ocean in Palm Beach. The original 17 acres of grounds contained many tropical trees brought from around the world by David Grandison Fairchild, noted botanist and friend of the Bingham family.  It was designed by local artisan and builder George Lainhart, with deep recessed porches, wide overhangs, and cross ventilation that provided the necessary comfort, without air conditioning.

Landmark
On December 5, 1972, it was added to the U.S. National Register of Historic Places. It was also documented by the Historic American Buildings Survey (HABS) in 1972.

Destruction
Subsequently, the residence was seriously damaged by fire and was demolished in 1974. The site was cleared except for the plantings.

Casa Apava
The Bingham's gave their daughter Frances Payne Bingham Bolton and her husband Chester C. Bolton an estate named Casa Apava, that was built just south of Figulus in 1919. The large laterally rambling Mediterranean Revival style complex was designed by architect Abram Garfield, the son of President Garfield.  The residence remains in near original condition, and was sold for $71.2 million in 2015.

See also
National Register of Historic Places listings in Palm Beach County, Florida

References

External links

HABS−Historic American Buildings Survey: Bingham-Blossom House (Figulus) homepage
HABS: Bingham-Blossom House (Figulus) — Historical and Descriptive Information.
HABS: Bingham-Blossom House (Figulus) — 1972 photos gallery, architectural photographer: Jack E. Boucher.
 National Register of Historic Places.com: Palm Beach County listings

Houses in Palm Beach County, Florida
Palm Beach, Florida
Houses completed in 1893
Buildings and structures demolished in 1974
Demolished buildings and structures in Florida
Former National Register of Historic Places in Florida
Houses on the National Register of Historic Places in Florida
National Register of Historic Places in Palm Beach County, Florida
Historic American Buildings Survey in Florida
Shingle Style houses
1893 establishments in Florida
1974 disestablishments in Florida
Shingle Style architecture in Florida